The 1965 Denver Broncos season was the sixth season for the team in the American Football League (AFL). The team improved slightly from the previous two seasons with a record of four wins, and ten losses. They finished last in the AFL's Western Division.

Personnel

Staff

Regular season

Standings

External links
 1965 Denver Broncos at Pro-Football-Reference.com

Denver Broncos seasons
Denver Broncos
1965 in sports in Colorado